The 2019 MAAC women's soccer tournament was the postseason women's soccer tournament for the Metro Atlantic Athletic Conference held from November 3 through November 10, 2019. The five-match tournament took place at campus sites, with the higher seed hosting matches.  The host for the matches was determined by seeding from regular season play.  The six-team single-elimination tournament consisted of three rounds based on seeding from regular season conference play. The Monmouth Hawks were the defending champions and successfully defended their title, defeating the Fairfield Stags 6–0 in the final.  This is the fourth consecutive title for Monmouth and 5th overall.  The title is also the 5th for head coach Krissy Turner.

Bracket

Source:

Schedule

First Round

Semifinals

Final

Statistics

Goalscorers 
3 Goals
 Lauren Karabin (Monmouth)

2 Goals
 Kelsey Araujo (Niagara)
 Victoria Colatosi (Marist)
 Maddie Gibson (Monmouth)
 Selena Salas (Quinnipiac)

1 Goal
 Jill Conklin (Monmouth)
 Gabby Diodati (Fairfield)
 Sarina Jones (Monmouth)
 Gretchen Kron (Quinnipiac)
 Ailis Martin (Rider)
 Lexie Palladino (Monmouth)
 Jesi Rossman (Monmouth)

All-Tournament team
Source:

MVP in bold

References 

2019 Metro Atlantic Athletic Conference women's soccer season
Metro Atlantic Athletic Conference Women's Soccer Tournament